Leland High School is an American public high school located in Leland, Illinois.  It serves grades 9 through 12 as part of the Leland Community School School District #1.

There are currently 62 students at Leland with a demographic distribution of 98% white students and  the remaining 2% of Hispanic descent.

References

External links

Great Schools profile
EducationBug profile

Public high schools in Illinois
Schools in LaSalle County, Illinois